Cypholaelaps is a genus of mites in the family Laelapidae.

Species
 Cypholaelaps haemisphaericus Berlese, 1916

References

Laelapidae